4S Ranch is a locale of San Diego County, California. To the east of 4S Ranch is the San Diego community of Rancho Bernardo. To the west is the Santa Fe Valley, which includes Rancho Santa Fe. Lake Hodges forms the northern border of the community while Black Mountain Ranch, which includes Del Sur and Santaluz, and Rancho Peñasquitos are both situated to the south. The ZIP Code is 92127, and the community is inside area code 858.

History
The origin of the name 4S Ranch is not specifically known. Some believe it’s a playful abbreviation of the word "forest"(4S). The first recorded owner of Rancho San Bernardo, as the area in which 4S Ranch is currently located and originally part of four separate sitios or square leagues, was acquired by an English sea captain named Joseph Snook "Captain Snook" (who later became a Mexican citizen and changed his name to Jose Francisco Snook) in 1842 and 1845 through land grants from the Mexican Governor of California. Many now believe the "S" in 4S Ranch stands for "Snook". The "4" may stand for "4 Snooks", after Snook and his three brothers or the 4 sitios or leagues granted to Snook. Contrary to myth, Snook and his wife never had any children. After his death, Snook's heirs sold the property to James McCoy for $4,020.

Between 1847 and the turn of the century, the site of 4S Ranch was used extensively for the grazing of both sheep and longhorn cattle. By 1915 4S Ranch had been obtained by the San Dieguito Mutual Water Company, a subsidiary of Santa Fe Railroad. The railroad erroneously believed that eucalyptus trees would make excellent railroad ties and planted thousands of them. This was unsuccessful and 4S Ranch was sold numerous times before being purchased by Albert E. Smith. In 1928, Albert Smith built the Spanish mission style house on a ridge overlooking Lake Hodges. This house remains today. Soon after, the property was acquired by William A. Clark, founder of the Los Angeles Philharmonic Orchestra. After Clark died in 1938, his widow sold 4S Ranch to Albert G. Ralphs of the Ralphs family, owners of the southern California grocery chain. 4S Ranch was primarily used by the Ralphs family for recreational and farming purposes until crop yields fell. Grass fires in 1944 and 1981 burned large portions of the original eucalyptus and citrus groves.

In the early 1980s, the Ralphs family agreed to develop the southern portion of their property (what is now the 4S Ranch master planned community by Newland Communities) and retain the northern  as a family retreat which had been operated as a working ranch for 50 years. In the 1980s the third generation of the Ralphs family was granted stewardship of 4S Ranch. Albert's grandson and granddaughter Bob Ralphs and Linda Ralphs spearheaded the family's efforts to develop the property since 1979. They received approval in 1984 from the county to develop  of the property, with the rest set aside for development at least until after 1992. A portion of 4S Ranch was within a Williamson Act Agricultural Preserve until the contract expired at the end of 1992. The development plans began in general for a $100-million first phase of development at 4S Ranch business park component that totaled , enough for about 3 million square feet of research and light-industrial space.

Development began in 1987 that was primarily a business park. Housing development began in the early 2000s and was completed in 2014. At least 4,700 homes spread over 2,900 acres make up the community. Of the remaining 1,184 acres owned by the Ralphs family in the most northerly area of 4S Ranch, approximately 90 percent is designated natural open space with a potential 11 single family homes to be built on large estates accessible via Ralphs Ranch Road.

Geography 
4S Ranch is underlain by Jurassic Santiago Peak Volcanics, Tertiary Stadium conglomerate, and slope wash alluvium. The land of 4S Ranch before development consisted of a variety of landforms ranging from nearly flat-lying mesas and gently rolling hills to rugged, steeply-sloping hillside terrain.

Retail 
The 4S Ranch retail area surrounds the intersection of Dove Canyon and Camino del Norte and is composed of three main sections: the 4S Ranch Village Center, 4S Commons Town Center and the 4S Health Center. The 4S Ranch Village Center includes the area's only gas station, veterinary care, restaurants, salons, and a Starbucks. 4S Commons Town Center has two grocery stores, restaurants, shopping and services, such as dry cleaning and shipping. The 4S Health Center is home to a variety of medical specialties including family medicine, oncology, pediatric dentistry, women's health, oral surgery, and facial plastic surgery.

Transportation 
Route 880 (4S Ranch Express) debuted on March 30, 2009, providing service to Sorrento Valley/UTC During peak commute times via MTS. The premium express service is a commuter service with limited stops by premium coach buses with service to Sorrento Valley and University Town Center transit center.
In 2014, Route 880 and all bus service to the 4S Ranch area had been cancelled. Service to Sorrento Valley has been replaced by Route 270 out of the Rancho Bernardo transit center. The station is a 30-minute walk or a 15-minute bike ride.

Camino del Norte and Rancho Bernardo Road provide the primary access for the community, and lead east to Interstate 15. Other major roads providing access to 4S Ranch are Camino del Sur and Carmel Valley Road, which both lead to the south and west and lead to California State Route 56 and Interstate 5, respectively.

Community events 
Fall Festival includes merchants with food, rides and games
Annual Easter Egg Hunt
Thank You Run/Walk 5K/10K Thanksgiving Day
Summer Movie Nights
4S Ranch Fourth of July Carnival and Street Faire Activities 
4S Ranch Fourth of July Fireworks Fireworks at Del Norte High School
4S Ranch Pumpkin Festival
Concerts in the Park

Parks and recreation 
There are several county parks including
4S Ranch Sports Park
Heritage Park
4S Ranch Community Park
Patriot Park
Pioneer Park
Liberty Park
Homestead Park

Schools
4S Ranch is served by numerous schools within the Poway Unified School District that opened beginning in 2004 when Stone Ranch Elementary opened and culminated with the opening of Design 39 Campus in August 2014.

High schools
 Del Norte High School

Middle schools
 Oak Valley Middle School

Elementary schools
 Stone Ranch Elementary School
 Monterey Ridge Elementary School
 Del Sur Elementary School

K-8 schools
 Design 39 Campus

Private schools
 Maranatha Christian Schools

Law enforcement and fire protection
4S Ranch is served by the San Diego County Sheriff's Department, with a substation located at 10282 Rancho Bernardo Road. Fire services are provided by the Rancho Santa Fe Fire Department, with a station located at 16930 Four Gee Road.

Community organizations

Youth sports 
4S Ranch Youth Football & Cheer
 4S Ranch Little League Baseball
Boys & Girls Club 4S Ranch Basketball, Volleyball, Community Pool, Camps
 4S Ranch Soccer
Arsenal FC San Diego
4S Ranch Girls Softball

Religious services 
GC2 Church
Maranatha Chapel
The City Church
Restoration Church

Charitable organizations 
4S Ranch~Del Sur Community Foundation

Library
The 4S Ranch branch of the San Diego County Library
opened to the public on April 26, 2007. The 4S Ranch Library is located in 4S Commons Center and serves as a community hub, focused on their large population of children and teens. The 4S Ranch branch is 7,214 square feet and has a fluctuating collection size of around 28,000 items.

References

External links 
San Diego North Chamber of Commerce's community profile of 4S Ranch
4S Ranch's Website
4S Ranch TownHUB Mobile App - Apple Store (no longer maintained 4/23/19)
4S Ranch TownHUB Mobile App - Google Play

Unincorporated communities in San Diego County, California
Unincorporated communities in California